Sharan Shivraj Patil is an Indian philanthropist and orthopaedic surgeon.

Life and career
Dr. Sharan Shivraj Patil was born in the district of Raichur in the state of Karnataka, India.  His early education took place in Gulbarga at Sharana Basaveshwara Samsthana. In 1979, he moved to Bangalore and attended premedical school training at the MES College Bangalore.

Sharan Patil completed his medical school with an academic distinction from M. R. Medical College Gulbarga, followed by a brief stint at St. Martha's Hospital in Bangalore. He followed it with a post-graduate degree at Kasturba Medical College Manipal and graduated with a diploma in orthopaedics in 1990. In 1991 he graduated with a Master of Surgery in orthopaedics and was awarded a Gold medal.

In 1992, Sharan Patil moved to the United Kingdom for further training in the North West of England. His training included the Alder Hey Children's Hospital, Royal Liverpool University Hospital, Hope Hospital, Manchester and Warrington District General Hospital.  In December 1995, he was bestowed with Mch. Ortho from Liverpool University.

Sharan Patil returned to India in 1996 and joined Manipal Hospital in Bangalore. He later decided to bring high-quality medical care to poorer citizens, resulting in the birth of Sparsh Hospital.

Lakshmi Tatma
The story of Lakshmi Tatma, a two-year-old ischiopagus conjoined twin with eight limbs from a remote village in the district of Araria of the state of Bihar, India, brought worldwide attention to Sparsh Hospital.

Patil traveled to Bihar in September 2007 to bring Lakshmi Tatma for treatment at Sparsh Hospital in Bangalore.

Lakshmi Tatma went for surgery on 6 November 2007.  This marathon surgery led by Patil constituted a large team of doctors, nurses, paramedical staff and which included the famous paediatric anesthetist Yohannan John. The operation lasted 19 hours and resulted in the successful separation of the parasitic twin from the body of Lakshmi Tatma.

This was the first time that surgery of this magnitude was conducted in India.  The entire treatment process was carried out free of cost through the Sparsh Foundation.

References

External links
Profile of Dr.  Sharan Shivraj Patil
Dr Sharan patil and team get PM's accolades Deccan Herald
CNN-IBN Indian of the year - Public service nominee

20th-century Indian medical doctors
Indian philanthropists
Indian surgeons
Living people
People from Raichur district
1965 births
Manipal Academy of Higher Education alumni
Medical doctors from Karnataka
Recipients of the Rajyotsava Award 2007
20th-century surgeons